Gemma Burgess was one of the first new adult authors picked up by St. Martin's Press, the publisher who first coined the term "New Adult" in 2009. Her critically acclaimed Brooklyn Girls series centers on five twenty-something girls and the humor, heartbreak, and drama that bring them together.

"Brooklyn Girls" was first published in 2012, "Love And Chaos" was published in 2013, and the next book in the series, "The Wild One," will be out November 10, 2015. The Brooklyn Girls series has been translated into seven languages and is available in over 40 countries.

Burgess is also the author of The Dating Detox and A Girl Like You (HarperCollins UK). She currently lives in New York City with her husband and three children.

"True Love", an hourlong post-feminist romantic dramedy written by Burgess, has been put in development by American Broadcasting Company. The potential pilot is to be directed by Anne Fletcher.

On October 5, 2020, Burgess signed with the UTA to develop two projects for Amazon. These projects include a half-hour espionage comedy titled Friends Like These, and an adaptation of the historical fantasy adventure novel, My Lady Jane.

References

Living people
Chick lit writers
American women novelists
Place of birth missing (living people)
Year of birth missing (living people)
21st-century American novelists
21st-century American women